Alfons Ślusarski (born 23 January 1942) is a Polish former rower. He competed at the 1964, 1968, 1972 and the 1976 Summer Olympics.

References

External links
 
 

1942 births
Living people
Polish male rowers
Olympic rowers of Poland
Rowers at the 1964 Summer Olympics
Rowers at the 1968 Summer Olympics
Rowers at the 1972 Summer Olympics
Rowers at the 1976 Summer Olympics
People from Puławy County
Sportspeople from Lublin Voivodeship
World Rowing Championships medalists for Poland